Amundson is a Swedish patronymic surname meaning "son of Amund". Notable people with this surname include the following:

People
Karl Amundson (1873–1938), Swedish ballooner, military attaché and Major General
Kristen J. Amundson, American politician
Lou Amundson, American basketball player
Monti Amundson, American guitarist
Neal Amundson, American chemical engineer and professor
Norman E. Amundson, Canadian professor

See also
Amundsen (surname)

Swedish-language surnames
Patronymic surnames